Southern Pacific 1237 is an S-10 class 0-6-0 steam locomotive built by Baldwin Locomotive Works.  The locomotive was put in service August 31, 1918, and retired August 19, 1956, it was donated to the City of Salinas, California by the Southern Pacific Railroad, in the summer of 1957. 1237 is an oil fired yard switcher.

Current status
The locomotive is stationed east of Amtrak Depot in Salinas, California. The Monterey and Salinas Valley Railroad Club cares for the locomotive and has done a static restoration of it.

See also
 List of preserved Southern Pacific Railroad rolling stock
 Southern Pacific 1215

References

Baldwin locomotives
1215
0-6-0 locomotives
Individual locomotives of the United States
Preserved steam locomotives of California
Standard gauge locomotives of the United States
Railway locomotives introduced in 1918